Billy Manual Ashley (born July 11, 1970) is an American former Major League Baseball outfielder.

Minor leagues
Ashley was drafted by the Los Angeles Dodgers in the 3rd round of the 1988 MLB Draft. He started his professional career with the Gulf Coast Dodgers in 1988 and 1989. He played with the Bakersfield Dodgers in 1990, the Vero Beach Dodgers in 1991, the San Antonio Missions in 1992 and the Albuquerque Dukes for most of 1992–1994.  A big time home run threat in the minors, Ashley hit 24 homers with San Antonio in 1992, 26 with the Dukes in 1993 and 37 in 1994.

He was a Triple-A All-Star and Pacific Coast League All-Star in 1993 and 1994. Also in 1994, he was selected a Baseball America first team Minor League All-Star, the Pacific Coast League MVP, Los Angeles Dodgers Minor League Player of the Year in and Triple-A Player of the Year.

He is one of three Dodgers position players to have been twice selected as the organization's Minor League Player of the Year, along with Joc Pederson and Paul Konerko.

Major leagues
He made his major league debut on September 1, 1992, against the Chicago Cubs and recorded his first major league hit on September 6 against the Pittsburgh Pirates.

Ashley made the Dodgers Opening Day roster for the 1995 season and for the next three seasons was a spot starter/pinch hitter for the Dodgers. He tied the Dodgers single-season record for pinch-hit homers in 1996. Due to his inability to hit for a high average, his high strikeout frequency, and his poor defensive play, the Dodgers released him before the beginning of the 1998 season.

He was signed as a free agent by the Boston Red Sox. He spent most of the season with the Triple-A Pawtucket Red Sox but played in 13 games with the major league team. His most productive day with the Red Sox was on July 3, 1998, when went 3 for 4 and hit a grand slam home run against the Chicago White Sox.

He spent 1999 with the Toledo Mud Hens in the Detroit Tigers farm system and then retired from baseball.

Throughout his Minor League career, Ashley was a highly touted power-hitting prospect. However, his success in the minors did not transfer to the big league level, and he did not accumulate a batting average higher than .237 or hit more than 9 home runs in a season. His career concluded with 144 total hits and 236 total strikeouts. He did however achieve a measure of notoriety for a time as a pinch-hitter.

Miscellaneous
He was featured in the Fox Reality Channel's original series Househusbands of Hollywood. He is currently the baseball head coach for Malibu High School in Malibu, CA. As of 2015, Ashley is also serving as an Alumni member of the Los Angeles Dodgers Community Relations team.

References

External links

Baseball Cube
Retrosheet
The Baseball Gauge
Venezuela Winter League

1970 births
Living people
Albuquerque Dukes players
Bakersfield Dodgers players
Baseball players from Michigan
Boston Red Sox players
Fargo-Moorhead RedHawks players
Gulf Coast Dodgers players
Leones del Caracas players
American expatriate baseball players in Venezuela
Los Angeles Dodgers players
Major League Baseball left fielders
Minor league baseball managers
Newark Bears players
Pawtucket Red Sox players
People from Trenton, Michigan
San Antonio Missions players
St. George Pioneerzz players
St. Paul Saints players
Toledo Mud Hens players
Vero Beach Dodgers players
Pacific Coast League MVP award winners